Llanfynydd railway station was a station in Llanfynydd, Flintshire, Wales. The station was opened on 2 May 1898, closed to passengers on 27 March 1950 and closed completely on 1 May 1952.

References

Further reading

Disused railway stations in Flintshire
Railway stations in Great Britain opened in 1898
Railway stations in Great Britain closed in 1950
Former Great Western Railway stations
Former London and North Western Railway stations